Jesper Jensen (born 5 February 1987) is a Danish professional ice hockey forward who is currently playing with the Frederikshavn White Hawks of the Metal Ligaen (DEN). He participated at the 2010 IIHF World Championship as a member of the Denmark National men's ice hockey team.

While in his third season with Brynäs IF in the 2018–19 campaign, having recorded 7 points through 26 games, Jensen left the club and immediately joined Skellefteå AIK for the remainder of the season on 23 January 2019. He contributed with three assists in the final ten regular season games before making six post-season appearances.

On 25 April 2019, as a free agent, Jensen agreed to a one-year contract with the Malmö Redhawks, his fourth SHL club.

Career statistics

Regular season and playoffs

International

References

External links
 

1987 births
Living people
Brynäs IF players
Danish ice hockey forwards
Frederikshavn White Hawks players
People from Nybro Municipality
Hamburg Freezers players
Karlskrona HK players
Malmö Redhawks players
Rögle BK players
Skellefteå AIK players
Ice hockey players at the 2022 Winter Olympics
Olympic ice hockey players of Denmark